Abbasabad (also Romanized as ‘Abbāsābād) is a village in Chuqur Rural District, Tarom Sofla District, Qazvin County, Qazvin Province, Iran. At the 2006 census, its population was 305, in 57 families.

References 

Populated places in Qazvin County